Yana is a town in Northern Province of Sierra Leone, near the border with Guinea.

Yana is located in the plains of Sierra Leone.

Elevation = 75m

References 

Populated places in Sierra Leone